Archilema vilis is a moth of the subfamily Arctiinae first described by Sven Jorgen R. Birket-Smith in 1965. It is found in Nigeria.

References

Endemic fauna of Nigeria
Moths described in 1965
Lithosiini
Insects of West Africa
Moths of Africa